Bradley Evan Young (born 23 February 1973) is an Australian former cricketer. A left-arm orthodox spinner who was also an aggressive lower order right hand batsman, Young played six One Day Internationals for Australia in the 1998/99 period. Young was selected for Australia at the 1998 Commonwealth Games in Kuala Lumpur, taking a hat trick against New Zealand and winning a silver medal after losing to South Africa in the final.

Young's final match for Australia ended after he slid into the fence trying to prevent a boundary and needed to be carried from the Sydney Cricket Ground in considerable pain after injuring his leg.

In 1998 and 2001 Young was the professional for Lancashire League team East Lancashire Cricket Club.

On 12 December 2012, Young signed with the Adelaide Strikers, as a replacement for the injured Jon Holland.

Young held the record of the most deliveries needed by an Australian to claim his first One Day International wicket when he took 201 deliveries before being overtaken by Glenn Maxwell in February 2013.

References

1973 births
Living people
Australia One Day International cricketers
South Australia cricketers
Cricketers at the 1998 Commonwealth Games
Commonwealth Games silver medallists for Australia
Australian cricketers
Adelaide Strikers cricketers
Commonwealth Games medallists in cricket
Medallists at the 1998 Commonwealth Games